Dionisio Magbuelas (20 March 1846 - 1911), Dionisio Seguela or Dionisio Papa y Barlucia, more widely known as Papa Isio (Hiligaynon: Isio the Pope), was the leader of a group of babaylanes who were, as conjectured by Modesto P. Sa-onoy, recruited from the remnants of the followers of Dios Buhawi upon the dissolution of his group under the poor leadership of Camartin de la Cruz during the years prior to the onset of the Philippine Revolution.

Early life
Magbuelas was the son of migrants from Panay, either Antique or San Joaquin, Iloilo, who cleared a small piece of land in the forests of Himamaylan. In his younger years, Papa Isio witnessed the loss of their small landholding to the marauding sugar barons of Negros. His family then moved to Payao in Binalbagan. When his parents died, Magbuelas gathered coconut sap to make native coconut wine in order to make ends meet. He later reportedly worked for the family of Carlos Gemora in Ilog. By 1880, he was 34 years old and was working as a cattle herder in the farm of the Montilla family in Tinungan. It was here that Magbuelas had a scuffle with a Spaniard and his opponent was wounded. Fearing reprisal from the Spanish authorities, Magbuelas fled to the mountains at the time that Dios Buhawi was leading his revolt. He may have joined this group as a means of avoiding the civil guards.

Revolution

According to Sa-onoy, Magbuelas's nom de guerre Papa Isio was partly dictated by the religious thrust of his revolt against Spain and the Christianity it championed. The title "Papa" was a repudiation of the Pope's (Santo Papa) authority—which Magbuelas then appropriated upon himself. This particular group of babaylanes were organized by Magbuelas in 1896 in Himamaylan, Negros Occidental.

Fusing religion with agrarian reform and nationalism, Papa Isio called for the removal of foreigners from Negros and the division of the land among the natives. It is contended that Papa Isio responded to the Philippine Revolution which was begun in August 1896 by Andrés Bonifacio. The group of babaylanes was said to have adopted "¡Viva Rizal!" (Spanish, "Long live Rizal!"), "¡Viva Filipinas libre!" (Spanish, "Long live a free Philippines!") and "Kamatayon sa Katsila" (Hiligaynon, "Death to Spaniards!") as their battle cries.

While Filipino revolutionary General Miguel Malvar, widely acknowledged to be the last leader of the Philippine Revolution to surrender to the Americans, actually capitulated on April 16, 1902, Papa Isio gave up his struggle very much later - on August 6, 1907. Finally cornered by government forces, Papa Isio surrendered to an American officer, Lieutenant J. S. Mohler. At first, he was sentenced to death, but the punishment was later mitigated to life imprisonment. Papa Isio died in the Old Bilibid Prison in Manila in 1911.

Commemoration
On November 6, 2009, the National Historical Institute of the Philippines unveiled a historical marker in honor of Dionisio Magbuelas at the public plaza of Isabela, Negros Occidental. The marker states:

In popular media
 Filipino author Eric Gamalinda based his 2000 novel My Sad Republic loosely on the person of Papa Isio.
 The Kanlaon Theater and Dance Company, the student theater and dance group of Colegio San Agustin-Bacolod, staged Papa Isio... Tingog Sang Kadam-an (Hiligaynon, "Papa Isio, Voice of the Masses"), a musical based on the life of Papa Isio, during the Second National Theater Festival hosted by the Cultural Center of the Philippines in February, 1996.
 Don Papa Rum, a rum distilled from sugar cane, is inspired by Papa Isio.

See also
Philippine Revolution
Negros Island
Negros Revolution
Dios Buhawi
Babaylan

Notes and references

1846 births
Karay-a people
People from Negros Occidental
Filipino revolutionaries
Filipino religious leaders
1911 deaths